Hoac, or variations, may refer to:

 An abbreviation of the chemical compound of Acetic acid
 HOAC, predecessor to Diamond Aircraft Industries
 Historians of American Communism, a scholarly historical organization established in 1982
 Hillingdon Outdoor Activity Centre, in the London Borough of Hillingdon